William Carey Dowd Sr. (March 21, 1865 – September 23, 1927) was an American football player and coach, politician, and publisher.  He served as the first head football coach at  Wake Forest University, coaching the team for one game in 1888.  Dowd later became a Speaker of the North Carolina House of Representatives and established a newspaper, The Charlotte News.

Head coaching record

References

External links
 

1865 births
1927 deaths
19th-century players of American football
American football quarterbacks
American newspaper publishers (people)
Members of the North Carolina House of Representatives
Wake Forest Demon Deacons football coaches
Wake Forest Demon Deacons football players
People from Moore County, North Carolina
Players of American football from North Carolina
Speakers of the North Carolina House of Representatives